Kosatarosh is a village and jamoat in western Tajikistan. It is part of the city of Panjakent in Sughd Region. The jamoat has a total population of 18,986 (2015). It consists of 11 villages, including Novichomoq (the seat), Kosatarosh, Bedak, Jomchashma, Filmandar, Ganji Nihon, Chorbogh and Jilav.

References

Populated places in Sughd Region
Jamoats of Tajikistan